Roger G. DeKok (January 10, 1947 – April 23, 2003) was a lieutenant general in the United States Air Force.

Personal life
DeKok was a graduate of the University of Wisconsin-Madison, obtaining a Bachelor of Arts in mathematics. DeKok earned a Master of Science degree in systems management in 1979 from the Air Force Institute of Technology. He died on April 24, 2003, during a business trip.

Military career
In 1971 DeKok was assigned to the North American Air Defense Command. Later he would work on the Space Shuttle program. In 1987 he was assigned to the White House and in 1989 he was assigned to The Pentagon. Later he would take command of the 1st Space Wing, 2d Space Wing, and 50th Space Wing. In 1993 he was named director of plans of Air Force Space Command and was named director of operations at the United States Space Command in 1995. The next year he took command of the Space and Missile Systems Center. In 2000 he was named vice commander of the Air Force Space Command. His retirement was effective as of April 1, 2002.

Awards DeKok received include the Air Force Distinguished Service Medal, the Defense Superior Service Medal with oak leaf cluster, the Legion of Merit, the Meritorious Service Medal with three oak leaf clusters, the Joint Service Commendation Medal, the Air Force Commendation Medal with oak leaf cluster, the Air Force Achievement Medal, the Presidential Service Badge, and the Astronaut Badge.

References

1947 births
2003 deaths
American astronauts
Recipients of the Defense Superior Service Medal
Recipients of the Air Force Distinguished Service Medal
Recipients of the Legion of Merit
United States Air Force generals
University of Wisconsin–Madison College of Letters and Science alumni
Air Force Institute of Technology alumni